Jászberényi Futball Club is a professional football club based in Jászberény, Jász-Nagykun-Szolnok County, Hungary, that competes in the Nemzeti Bajnokság III, the third tier of Hungarian football.

Name changes
2012–14: Nagyiváni Községi és Jászberényi Sportegyesület és Futball Club
2014–present: Jászberényi Futball Club

Honours
Nemzeti Bajnokság III:

Current squad
.

External links
 Profile on Magyar Futball

References

Football clubs in Hungary
Association football clubs established in 2012
2012 establishments in Hungary